And Through It All: Robbie Williams Live 1997–2006 is a DVD that was released in November 2006 of various live performances recorded between 1997 and 2006.

Track listing

Also on disc 2: Eternity 5:04

Charts

Certifications

References

Robbie Williams video albums
2006 video albums
Live video albums
2006 live albums